Maurice Bembridge (born 21 February 1945) is an English golfer. He won the 1969 News of the World Match Play, the 1971 Dunlop Masters and won six times on the European Tour from its formation in 1972.  He also won tournaments around the world, including the Kenya Open three times. He played in the Ryder Cup four successive times from 1969 to 1975 and represented England twice in the World Cup. At the 1974 Masters Tournament, Bembridge tied the course record with a 64 in the final round, lifting him into a tie for 9th place.

Professional career
Bembridge turned professional at an early age in 1960 and was an assistant at Worksop Golf Club. In 1966 he won the Llandudno Assistant Professionals' Tournament and was a runner-up in the Gor-Ray Cup, the PGA Assistants’ Championship, behind Vince Hood. In 1967 Bembridge moved to Little Aston Golf Club and had more success, winning the Gor-Ray Cup and the Hesketh Assistant Professionals' Tournament. Bembridge qualified for the Open Championship in both 1966 and 1967, although he missed the cut on both occasions. In 1967 he led the qualifiers at Delamere Forest Golf Club.

In April 1968 Bembridge had his first overseas success, winning the Kenya Open, two strokes ahead of Terry Westbrook. Later in the year he finished 5th in the Open Championship, four shots behind winner Gary Player and was the leading British golfer. In April 1969 Bembridge retained his Kenya Open title. In June he won the Sumrie Better-Ball, which he and Ángel Gallardo won by a shot from Hedley Muscroft and Lionel Platts. In July he was selected for the Ryder Cup at Royal Birkdale, to be played in late September. In early September, Bembridge had his first big solo tournament win, the News of the World Match Play, where he beat 56-year-old Dai Rees 6&5 in the 18-hole final. Bembridge performed well in the tied Ryder Cup match with two wins and a half in his five matches. His victory in the News of the World Match Play earned Bembridge an invitation to play in the 1969 Piccadilly World Match Play Championship, where he lost 6&5 to Bob Charles.

In 1971 Bembridge had his first important British stroke-play victory, taking the Dunlop Masters, two strokes ahead of Peter Oosterhuis.

Bembridge played on the European Tour from its foundation in 1972. In March 1972 he won the Lusaka Open in Zambia, by a stroke from Doug McClelland, having started with a 63, but he only finished 19th in the European Tour Order of Merit that season. He finished second in the European Tour Order of Merit was second in 1973. He won the Martini International, was third three times and had a number of other top-10 finishes. Bembridge won three times on the 1974 European Tour, the Piccadilly Medal, the Double Diamond Strokeplay and the Viyella PGA Championship but was less consistent, finishing 12th in the Order of Merit. He won again in 1975, the German Open where he won by 7 strokes. He was also runner-up in the Benson & Hedges Festival of Golf and finished 11th in the Order of Merit.
 
After 1975 his best year was 1979 when he won his third Kenya Open and had his final European Tour win in the Benson & Hedges International Open, a result that lifted him to 18th in the Order of Merit. He also came close to winning the 1982 Irish Open where he was runner-up, a stroke behind John O'Leary. Bembridge continued playing on the European Tour but with less success, his final season being 1987.

After turning fifty Bembridge played on the European Senior Tour, winning twice at that level, the 1996 Hippo Jersey Seniors and the 1998 Swedish Seniors. He was also runner-up in the 2001 De Vere PGA Seniors Championship and was twice in the top 10 of the Order of Merit, 7th in 1996 and 9th in 1997. He was a member of the European Senior Tour committee for nine years and was its chairman from 2007 to 2011.

Professional wins (19)

European Tour wins (6)

Safari Circuit wins (1)

Other wins (10)
1966 Llandudno Assistant Professionals' Tournament
1967 Gor-Ray Cup, Hesketh Assistant Professionals' Tournament
1968 Kenya Open
1969 Kenya Open, Sumrie Better-Ball (with Ángel Gallardo), News of the World Match Play
1970 Caltex Tournament (tie with Terry Kendall)
1971 Dunlop Masters
1972 Lusaka Open

European Senior Tour wins (2)

European Senior Tour playoff record (1–0)

Results in major championships

Note: Bembridge only played in the Masters Tournament and The Open Championship.

CUT = missed the half-way cut (3rd round cut in 1969, 1980 and 1981 Open Championships)
"T" indicates a tie for a place

Team appearances
Ryder Cup (representing Great Britain & Ireland): 1969, 1971, 1973, 1975
World Cup (representing England): 1974, 1975
Double Diamond International (representing England): 1973, 1974 (winners), 1975
Philip Morris International (representing England): 1976
Praia d'El Rey European Cup: 1997 (winners)

References

External links

English male golfers
European Tour golfers
European Senior Tour golfers
Ryder Cup competitors for Europe
Sportspeople from Worksop
1945 births
Living people